Kitka is a village in the municipality of Avren, in Varna Province, northeastern Bulgaria.

References

Villages in Varna Province